The 1986 NCAA Division II Soccer Championship was the 15th annual tournament held by the NCAA to determine the top men's Division II college soccer program in the United States.

Defending champions Seattle Pacific defeated Oakland, 4–1, to win their fourth Division II national title. The Falcons (17-4-2), winners of three out of the four previous tournaments, were coached by Cliff McCrath.

The final match was played on December 6 at Seattle Pacific University in Seattle, Washington.

Bracket

Final

See also  
 NCAA Division I Men's Soccer Championship
 NCAA Division III Men's Soccer Championship
 NAIA Men's Soccer Championship

References 

NCAA Division II Men's Soccer Championship
NCAA Division II Men's Soccer Championship
NCAA Division II Men's Soccer Championship
NCAA Division II Men's Soccer Championship